The Saladin Governorate election of 2013 was held on 20 April 2013 alongside elections for all other governorates outside Iraqi Kurdistan, Kirkuk, Anbar and Nineveh.

Results 

|- style="background-color:#E9E9E9"
!align="left" colspan=2 valign=top|Party/Coalition!! Allied national parties !! Leader !!Seats !! Change !!Votes
|-
|
|align=left|Iraqi People's Coalition || align=left| || align=left|Ahmed Abdullah al-Jubouri || 7 || || 95,338
|-
|bgcolor="#0D4E76"|
|align=left|Muttahidoon ||align=left|al-HadbaIraqi Islamic Party || align=left|Usama al-Nujayfi || 5 || || 79,705
|-
|
|align=left|Iraq's Authenticity Coalition || || align=left| || 5 || || 66,549
|-
|bgcolor="#098DCD"|
|align=left|Al Iraqia National and United Coalition || || align=left|Ayad Allawi || 3 || || 46,287
|-
|
|align=left|Salahuddine National Alliance || || align=left| || 3 || || 39,447
|-
|
|align=left|Equality Front || || || || || 27,654
|-
|
|align=left|Arabian Al Iraqia || || || 2 || || 24,167
|-
|
|align=left|Salahuddine Unified Coalition || || || 2 || || 23,497
|-
|bgcolor="#CCFF33"|
|align=left|Brotherhood and Coexistence Alliance List || align=left|KDPPUK || || 1 || || 21,373
|-
|
|align=left|Salahuddine Turkmen's list || || || 1 || || 18,395
|-
|bgcolor="#F6BE22"|
|align=left|Iraq's Benevolence and Generosity List || || || || || 6,099
|-
|
|align=left|Reformers Gathering || || || || || 6,041
|-
|
|align=left|Iraq for Everyone National Bloc || || || || || 4,243
|-
|
|align=left|Citizenship and Change Movement || || || || || 3,117
|-
|
|align=left|Iraq's Light Movement || || || || || 3,023
|-
|
|align=left|Iraqi Justice and Democracy Alliance || || || || || 774
|-
|
|align=left|Islamic Advocates' Party || || || || || 553
|-
|
|align=left|Law Advocate Knights' Bloc || || || || || 468
|-
|
|align=left|Revolution Forces' Alliance in Iraq || || || || || 461
|-
|colspan=2 align=left| Total || || || 29 || 1 || 467,191
|-
|colspan=7 align=left|Sources: al-Sumaria – Salahuddin Coalitions, ISW, IHEC

Following the election Ahmed Abdullah al-Jubouri was re-elected as governor. In December 2013 Juburi was suspended by Prime Minister Nouri al-Maliki for at least two months while allegations of corruption were investigated.

References 

2013 Iraqi governorate elections